Mary Anne Sadlier (31 December 1820—5 April 1903) was an Irish author. Sadlier published roughly twenty-three novels and numerous stories. She wrote for Irish immigrants in both the United States and Canada, encouraging them to attend mass and retain the Catholic faith. In so doing, Sadlier also addressed the related themes of anti-Catholicism, the Irish Famine, emigration, and domestic work. Her writings and translations are often found under the name Mrs. J. Sadlier. Earlier in her career, from 1840 to 1845, some of her works were published under the name "Anne Flinders".

Life
Mary Anne Madden was born in Cootehill, Co. Cavan, Ireland 31 December 1820. Upon the death of her father, Francis, a merchant, Mary Madden emigrated to Sainte-Marthe, Quebec in 1844, where she married publisher James Sadlier, also from Ireland, on 24 November 1846. Sadlier experienced her most productive literary period after her marriage. While living in Canada, Sadlier published eighteen books—five novels, one collection of short stories, a religious catechism, and nine translations from the French—in addition to assorted magazine articles she contributed to the Pilot and American Celt free of charge. During her literary career, Sadlier published twenty-three novels, translated seventeen books from the French, wrote short stories and several plays.

Sadlier apparently donated her articles out of sympathy with the nationalistic causes of Irish journals. During her stay in Montreal Sadlier also wrote two novels set in Ireland: Alice Riordan; the Blind Man's Daughter (1851) and New Lights; or, Life in Galway (1853). In New Lights, Sadlier deals with the Irish Famine for the first time. The book proved one of her most popular, going through at least eight editions in fifty years. In this novel, Sadlier focuses a polemical attack on the Protestant practice of converting Irish peasants by promising them soup, but condemns peasant retaliation and violence. Sadlier published much of her work in the family's Catholic magazine, The Tablet.

In the early 1860s, the couple moved to New York City. The Sadliers' New York home became a hub of literary activity in the Catholic community, and she also enjoyed the company of Irish writers in the United States and Canada, including New York Archbishop John Hughes, editor Orestes Brownson and Thomas D'Arcy McGee. She held weekly salons in her Manhattan home, as well as her summer home on Far Rockaway on Long Island (James, 219). Sadlier's closest friend was D'Arcy McGee, a poet, Irish nationalist exile, and Canadian statesman known as one of the founding "Fathers of Confederation" who helped bring about Canada's independence.

McGee and Sadlier shared an interest in a "national poetry" that would not only capture the spirit of a people, but inspire them to political and national independence. While McGee, as a man, could take part in political rallies and organize Irish-American support for Home Rule, Sadlier, as a woman, directed her support for Irish independence into literature. McGee's biographer notes that Sadlier's success inspired him to write emigrant novels, and that he was planning a novel on this subject at the time of his death (Phelan, 285). McGee's controversial politics cost him his life in 1868, when an Irish-American radical assassinated him, and his death was "a crushing blow to Mrs. Sadlier and her husband, who were his enthusiastic friends" (Anna Sadlier, 332). Sadlier edited a collection of McGee's poetry in 1869 in tribute to his memory.

In later years, she lost the copyright to all her earlier works, many of which remained in print. In 1902, she received a special blessing from Pope Leo XIII for her "illustrious service to the Catholic Church". Sadlier remained in New York for nine years before returning to Canada, where she died in 1903. One of Mary Anne's daughters, Anna Theresa Sadlier, also became a writer.

Selected works by Sadlier

Confessions of an apostate (1842) R.B. Seeley and W. Burnside, London; (1868) D. & J. Sadlier & Co. New York, Boston.
The "field of honour ; or, "scenes in the nineteenth century"(1844) W.H. Dalton, Cockspur Street, London
Naboth the Jezreelite; and other poems (1844) Bath 
The Red Hand of Ulster; or, The Fortunes of Hugh O'Neill (1850)
 Willy Burke; or, The Irish Orphan in America (1850)
The Blakes and Flanagans, A Tale Illustrative of Irish Life in the United States (1855)
The Confederate Chieftains: a Tale of the Irish Rebellion of 1641 (1860)
The Babbler; a drama for boys, in one act (1861)
Bessy Conway; or, The Irish Girl in America (1861)
Elinor Preston: or, Scenes at Home and Abroad (1861)
The Pope's Niece, and Other Tales (1862)
Old and New; or, Taste versus Fashion (1862)
Confessions of an Apostate; or, Leaves from a Troubled Life (1864))
Con O'Regan; or, Emigrant Life in the New World (1864)
Aunt Honor's Keepsake (1866)
The Secret (a drama) (1873)
The Young Lady's Reader (1882)
The Old House By The Boyne (1888)
Alissa Flecq (1894)
New Stories (1900)

References

Sources
 Madden, Mary Anne, pp. 153–153, in Dictionary of Nineteenth-Century Irish Women Poets, Ann Elry Colman, Kenny's Bookshop, Galway, 1996. .
 Catholic Novelists in Defense of Their Faith, 1829-1865, Willard Thorp, Arno Press, pp. 98–110
 Lot's Wife in the Novels of Mary Anne Sadlier, Janelle Peters, Postscripts, 5.2 (2009), pp. 185–204.

External links

Notes on Author
UPenn Online Books entry
Crossroads entry
Talbot School of Theology entry

1820 births
1903 deaths
19th-century Irish poets
People from County Cavan
Irish women poets
Irish emigrants to Canada (before 1923)
Roman Catholic writers
American women writers
Persons of National Historic Significance (Canada)
Laetare Medal recipients
Irish women novelists
19th-century Irish novelists
19th-century Irish women writers
19th-century Irish writers
Irish emigrants to the United States (before 1923)
American salon-holders